Antonina may refer to:

Geography
 Antonina, Paraná, a municipality in Brazil
 Antonina, Bełchatów County, in Łódź Voivodeship, central Poland
 Antonina, Pajęczno County, in Łódź Voivodeship, central Poland
 Antonina, Poddębice County, in Łódź Voivodeship, central Poland
 Antonina, Masovian Voivodeship, east-central Poland

Other uses
 Antonina (bug), a genus of mealybugs
 Antonina (name)
 Antonina (wife of Belisarius) (c. 495–after 565), Byzantine patrikia and wife of the general Belisarius
 Antonina (Tur novel), by Evgenia Tur
 Antonina (Collins novel), an 1850 novel by Wilkie Collins
 Antonina Nutshell, Swedish drag queen who competed in Drag Race Sverige

See also
 Antonia (disambiguation)
 Antonine (name)